Country Christian School, known as CCS, is a private Christian school in Molalla, Oregon, United States. It has been accredited through the Northwest Association of Accredited Schools since 1991. It has 3 state championships .

References

High schools in Clackamas County, Oregon
Christian schools in Oregon
Schools accredited by the Northwest Accreditation Commission
Molalla, Oregon
Private middle schools in Oregon
Private elementary schools in Oregon
Private high schools in Oregon